Wakamisugi Akiteru, also known as Daigō Hisateru,  (24 September 1937 – 2 November 1983) was a sumo wrestler from Kagawa, Japan. The highest rank he achieved was sekiwake. He was the brother in law of yokozuna Wakanohana Kanji I.

Career
He was born as Noburu Sugiyama in Marugame. He entered professional sumo in March 1955, recruited by Hanakago stable. He used a variety of different shikona, including his own surname of Sugiyama, Kunikaze and Misugiiso, before adopting the name Wakamisugi when he reached sekitori status upon promotion to the jūryō division in May 1958. He was promoted to the top makuuchi division in November 1958.

He won the top division championship in May 1960 from the rank of maegashira 4. After losing to ōzeki Wakahaguro on the opening day of the tournament he won his next 14 bouts. One of his wins was by default, over yokozuna Tochinishiki who had announced his retirement the previous day. He had a genuine victory over yokozuna Asashio on Day 4. He finished with a 14–1 record, one win ahead of yokozuna Wakanohana, who he did not have to fight as they were members of the same stable. It was his first and only tournament win.

In September 1962 Wakamisugi changed his shikona once again, to Daigō Hisateru. He was a tournament runner-up in November 1962 and November 1965, both times to Taihō. He held the sekiwake rank ten times in total, including seven consecutive tournaments from May 1963 to May 1964. He earned eight kinboshi for defeating yokozuna (most of them coming after he dropped from the sekiwake rank in 1964) and five came from the same yokozuna, Tochinoumi.

Retirement from sumo
He retired in May 1967 and became an elder of the Sumo Association under the name Araiso, working as a coach at Hanakago stable until his death.

Fighting style
Wakamisugi's favoured kimarite or techniques were hidari-yotsu (a right hand outside, left hand inside grip on the mawashi), uwatenage (overarm throw), and yorikiri (force out).

Career record
The Kyushu tournament was first held in 1957, and the Nagoya tournament in 1958.

See also
Glossary of sumo terms
List of sumo tournament top division champions
List of sumo tournament top division runners-up
List of past sumo wrestlers
List of sekiwake

References

External links
Complete career record

1937 births
1983 deaths
Japanese sumo wrestlers
Sekiwake
Sumo people from Kagawa Prefecture